Ocean County is a county located along the Jersey Shore in the south-central portion of the U.S. state of New Jersey. The county borders the Atlantic Ocean on the east. Its county seat is Toms River. Since 1990, Ocean County has been one of New Jersey's fastest-growing counties. As of the 2020 United States census, the county was the state's sixth-most-populous county, with a population of 637,229, its highest decennial count ever and an increase of 60,662 (+10.5%) from the 2010 census count of 576,567, which in turn reflected an increase of 65,651 (+12.8%) from the 2000 census population of 510,916. The county was the fastest-growing county in New Jersey between 2000 and 2010 in terms of increase in the number of residents and second-highest in the percentage of growth. Ocean County was established on February 15, 1850, from portions of Monmouth County, with the addition of Little Egg Harbor Township which was annexed from Burlington County on March 30, 1891.

As with the entire Jersey Shore, summer traffic routinely clogs local roadways throughout the season. Ocean County is comprised of 31.3% water.

Ocean County is part of the New York metropolitan area but is also home to many tourist attractions frequented  by Philadelphia metropolitan area residents, including the beachfront communities of Seaside Heights, Long Beach Island, and Point Pleasant Beach, and Six Flags Great Adventure, an amusement park that is the home to the world's tallest and second-fastest roller coaster, Kingda Ka. Ocean County is a gateway to New Jersey's Pine Barrens, one of the largest protected pieces of land on the East Coast. Ocean County is part of the New York City and Philadelphia media market.

Geography

Much of the county is flat and coastal, with many beaches. The highest point is one of three unnamed hills (one in Jackson Township, the other two in Plumsted Township) that reach at least  in elevation. The lowest elevation in the county is sea level.

It is also home to many beaches on the Jersey Shore, including Beach Haven, Seaside Heights, Ship Bottom, Surf City, Harvey Cedars, and Barnegat Light.

Climate

Ocean County's area consists of 31.3% water. The coastal county along the Atlantic Ocean has a humid subtropical climate (Cfa and including the coast). Areas closer to the coast typically experience more mild winters and cooler summers due to the Atlantic Ocean's influence. Average monthly temperatures in Tuckerton near the south end range from 33.2 °F in January to 75.7 °F in July.

Demographics

2020 census

2010 census

2000 census
As of the 2000 United States census there were 510,916 people, 200,402 households, and 137,876 families residing in the county. There were 248,711 housing units at an average density of 151/km2 (391/sq mi). The racial makeup of the county was 93.05% White, 2.99% Black or African American, 0.14% Native American, 1.28% Asian, 0.02% Pacific Islander, 1.24% from other races, and 1.29% from two or more races. 5.02% of the population were Hispanic or Latino of any race. Among those who listed their ancestry, 25.3% were of Italian, 23.6% Irish, 18.7% German, 8.8% Polish and 8.5% English ancestry according to Census 2000.
There were 200,402 households, out of which 28.10% had children under the age of 18 living with them, 56.40% were married couples living together, 9.20% had a female householder with no husband present, and 31.20% were non-families. 27.00% of all households were made up of individuals, and 16.50% had someone living alone who was 65 years of age or older. The average household size was 2.51 and the average family size was 3.06.

In the county, the population was spread out, with 23.30% under the age of 18, 6.60% from 18 to 24, 26.00% from 25 to 44, 21.90% from 45 to 64, and 22.20% who were 65 years of age or older. The median age was 41 years. For every 100 females, there were 90.40 males. For every 100 females age 18 and over, there were 86.40 males.
The median income for a household in the county was $46,443, and the median income for a family was $56,420. Males had a median income of $44,822 versus $30,717 for females. The per capita income for the county was $23,054. About 4.8% of families and 7.0% of the population were below the poverty line, including 10.0% of those under age 18 and 5.6% of those age 65 or over.

As of the 2000 Census, Mantoloking was the wealthiest community in the state of New Jersey with a per capita money income of $114,017 as of 1999.

Economy

Government

County government

Ocean County is governed by a Board of County Commissioners comprised of five members who are elected on an at-large basis in partisan elections and serving staggered three-year terms of office, with either one or two seats coming up for election each year as part of the November general election. At an annual reorganization held in the beginning of January, the board chooses a Director and a Deputy Director from among its members. In 2016, freeholders were paid $30,000 and the freeholder director was paid an annual salary of $31,000.

, Ocean County's Commissioners are (with terms for Chair and Vice-Chair ending every December 31st):  

 

Pursuant to Article VII Section II of the New Jersey State Constitution, each county in New Jersey is required to have three elected administrative officials known as "constitutional officers." These officers are the County Clerk and County Surrogate (both elected for five-year terms of office) and the County Sheriff (elected for a three-year term). Constitutional officers elected on a countywide basis are: Constitutional officers elected on a countywide basis are:

 

The Ocean County Prosecutor is Bradley D. Billhimer who was nominated by Governor of New Jersey Phil Murphy. Prosecutor Billhimer was sworn in by New Jersey Attorney General Gurbir Grewal on October 12, 2018. Ocean County constitutes Vicinage 14 of the New Jersey Superior Court and is seated at the Ocean County Courthouse Complex in Toms River; the Assignment Judge for Vicinage 14 is Marlene Lynch Ford.

Ocean County operates the Ocean County Southern Service Center in Manahawkin.  This center offers access to all of the Ocean County government services without the need for residents to travel to the county seat some 20 miles to the north.

Federal representatives 
The 2nd and 4th Congressional Districts cover the county.

State representatives

Politics
Ocean County is the most Republican county in New Jersey, a state that characteristically votes Democratic. In its history, it has failed to support a Republican for president only three times. All of its state legislators, County Commissioners, and countywide constitutional officers are Republicans. The last Democratic presidential candidate to win Ocean County was Bill Clinton in 1996, who carried the county with a 46% plurality of the vote. The last Democrat to win a majority in the county was Lyndon Johnson in 1964. As of October 1, 2021, there were a total of 458,230 registered voters in Ocean County, of whom 171,085 (37.3%) were registered as Republicans, 102,005 (22.3%) were registered as Democrats and 179,085 (39.1%) were registered as unaffiliated. There were 6,055 voters (1.3%) registered to other parties. Among the county's 2010 Census population, 63.2% were registered to vote, including 82.6% of those ages 18 and over.

In the 2008 presidential election, Republican John McCain received 58.4% of the vote here (160,677 cast), ahead of Democrat Barack Obama with 40.1% (110,189 votes) among the 276,544 ballots cast by the county's 380,712 registered voters, for a turnout of 72.6%. The Republican vote totals and overall turnout were significantly down in 2012 due to damage and displacement caused by Hurricane Sandy just days before the election. In 2016 and 2020, it was New Jersey's most Republican county, and in 2020, it was the only one to give Donald Trump more than 60% of the vote.

|}

In the 2009 gubernatorial election, Republican Chris Christie received 65.6% of the vote here (124,238 ballots cast), ahead of Democrat Jon Corzine with 28.4% (53,761 votes), Independent Chris Daggett with 4.8% (9,068 votes) and other candidates with 1.2% (1,955 votes), among the 193,186 ballots cast by the county's 371,066 registered voters, yielding a 52.1% turnout. In the 2013 gubernatorial election, Republican Chris Christie received 75.7% of the vote here (125,781 ballots cast), ahead of Democrat Barbara Buono with 22.8% (37,930 votes), In the 2017 gubernatorial election, Republican Kim Guadagno received 98,135 (62.1%) of the vote, and Democrat Phil Murphy received 56,682 (35.8%) of the vote. In the 2021 gubernatorial election, Republican Jack Ciattarelli received 67.5% of the vote (145,756 ballots cast) to Democrat Phil Murphy's 31.8% (68,615 votes). Ocean County has been the most Republican in the last three gubernatorial elections.

Education

Tertiary education
Ocean County College is the two-year community college for Ocean County, one of a network of 19 county colleges statewide. The school is in Toms River and was founded in 1964.

Georgian Court University in Lakewood Township is a private Roman Catholic Sisters of Mercy college, which opened in 1908 on the former winter estate of millionaire George Jay Gould I, son of railroad tycoon Jay Gould. Lakewood is also home to Beth Medrash Govoha, a Haredi yeshiva with 5,000 students, making it one of the largest yeshivas in the world and the largest outside the State of Israel.

Stockton University has a campus located in Manahawkin offering undergraduate and graduate colleges of the arts, sciences and professional studies of the New Jersey state system of higher education.

Primary and secondary schools

School districts in the county include:

K-12

 Barnegat Township School District
 Brick Public Schools
 Jackson School District
 Lacey Township School District
 Lakewood School District
 Manchester Township School District
 Plumsted Township School District
 Point Pleasant Beach School District
 Point Pleasant School District
 Toms River Regional Schools

Secondary
 Central Regional School District
 Ocean County Vocational Technical School
 Pinelands Regional School District
 Southern Regional School District

Elementary (K-6, except as noted)

 Bay Head School District (K-8)
 Beach Haven School District
 Berkeley Township School District
 Eagleswood Township School District
 Island Heights School District
 Lakehurst School District (K-8)
 Lavallette School District (K-8)
 Little Egg Harbor Township School District
 Long Beach Island Consolidated School District
 Ocean Gate School District
 Ocean Township School District
 Seaside Heights School District
 Seaside Park School District (non-operating)
 Stafford Township School District
 Tuckerton School District

New Jersey's largest suburban school district, Toms River Regional Schools, is located in Ocean County. Toms River is also home to the county's only Roman Catholic high school, Monsignor Donovan High School, operated by the Roman Catholic Diocese of Trenton, which also has six elementary schools located in the county.

In addition to multiple public high schools, the county has an extensive vocational high school program, known as the Ocean County Vocational Technical School district. In addition to its campuses in Brick, Toms River, Waretown, and Jackson, it contains two magnet schools:
Marine Academy of Technology and Environmental Science (MATES)
OCVTS Performing Arts Academy – theater, dance, and vocal

Attractions
Ocean County has an extensive shoreline stretch along the Atlantic Ocean, including the Jersey Shore communities and oceanfront boardwalk resorts of Seaside Heights and Point Pleasant Beach.

Six Flags Great Adventure, America's largest Six Flags theme park, is home to the world's tallest and formerly fastest roller coaster, Kingda Ka. The park also contains Six Flags Hurricane Harbor, New Jersey's largest water park, and the  Six Flags Wild Safari, the largest drive-thru animal safari outside of Africa.

Forty miles of barrier beaches form the Barnegat and Little Egg Harbor Bays, offering ample watersports. It also is home of the Tuckerton Seaport, a  maritime history village in Tuckerton. In addition to being the northeast gateway to New Jersey's Pine Barrens, Ocean County is also home to several state parks:
Barnegat Lighthouse State Park covers  surrounding Barnegat Lighthouse at the northern tip of Long Beach Island.
Island Beach State Park has  of coastal dunes.
Double Trouble State Park includes  of land in the New Jersey Pine Barrens.
Brendan T. Byrne State Forest includes  and was formerly known as Lebanon State Forest.
Forked River State Marina

FirstEnergy Park located in Lakewood, opened in 2001 with 6,588 reserved seats and is home of the Jersey Shore BlueClaws, the High-A affiliate of the Philadelphia Phillies.

National protected area

Media
The Asbury Park Press and The Press of Atlantic City are daily newspapers that cover the county. Micromedia Publications publishes six weekly local newspapers in the county; their seventh covers Howell Township, New Jersey in Monmouth County, New Jersey.

92.7 WOBM provides news, traffic and weather updates.

91.9 WBNJ provides local news, PSAs and events; as well as weather updates.

Transportation

Roads and highways

Ocean County has various major roads that pass through. State routes that go through include Route 13, Route 35, Route 37, Route 70, Route 72, Route 88, and Route 166. Other major routes that pass through are U.S. Route 9, the Garden State Parkway, and I-195, the only Interstate to pass through Ocean County (in Jackson Township).

Several prominent 500 series county highways make up an important portion of the automobile corridors in Ocean County. These include County Road 526, County Road 527, County Road 528, County Road 530, NJ County Road 532, County Road 539, County Road 547, County Road 549, and County Road 571.

Public transportation

Train
NJ Transit's (NJT) North Jersey Coast Line, which serves New York Penn Station and passes through Middlesex and Monmouth counties, offers service at the Bay Head and Point Pleasant Beach stations, located at the northernmost corner of the county. The Monmouth Ocean Middlesex Line is a passenger rail project proposed by NJT to serve he northern central part of the county. Southern Ocean County is also located about 25 miles from the Atlantic City Line, which provides service to Philadelphia.

Bus

NJ Transit
Bus service is provided on NJ Transit bus routes 130, 132, 136, and 139 to and from Lakewood Bus Terminal on the U.S. Route 9 corridor. Expanded use Route 9 BBS (bus bypass shoulder lanes) is under study. Bus route 559 provides service along Route 9 between Lakewood and Pleasantville before continuing to Atlantic City.

Bus route 137 provides service in three variants. One is a nonstop express between Toms River and New York City that operates seven days a week. The other two are rush hour only services, one operating along County Route 549 between Toms River and Brick Township before continuing onto New York City. The Other begins and ends in Lakewood, operating via County Line Road to the Brick park and ride before continuing to New York.

Bus route 67 operates between Toms River and Newark, providing service along County Route 549 between Toms River and Brick before continuing onto Lakewood and points north. Bus Route 317 crosses the county in an east–west fashion on its route between Philadelphia and Asbury Park. This route also provides service to Fort Dix, Camden, and other destinations. Bus route 319 makes a single stop in Toms River on its route between Atlantic City and New York.

Ocean Ride
Ocean Ride is a county wide system with 12 regular routes, many serving Ocean County Mall, which acts as transfer hub. Of these routes, only the OC 10 (Lavallette to Toms River) operates Monday-Saturday, with the OC 4 (Point Pleasant to Lakewood) operating Monday-Friday. All other routes run 2–3 days a week. Ocean Ride also provides paratransit service throughout the county.

Other services
Academy Bus provides service between various areas in the northern part of the county and New York City. Many of the retirement communities contract for the operation of shuttle buses to connect the communities with various shopping centers in the county.

Municipalities
The 33 municipalities in Ocean County with 2010 census data for population, housing units, and area in square miles are: Other, unincorporated communities in the county are listed alongside their parent municipality (or municipalities). Most of these areas are census-designated places that have been created by the United States Census Bureau for enumeration purposes within a Township. The numbers in parentheses stand for the numbers on the map.

See also

National Register of Historic Places listings in Ocean County, New Jersey

References

Further reading
 Salter, Edwin. A History of Monmouth and Ocean Counties Embracing a Genealogical Record of Earliest Settlers of Monmouth and Ocean Counties and Their Descendants; The Indians: Their Language, Manners, and Customs; Important Historical Events: The Revolutionary War, Battle of Monmouth, The War of the Rebellion: Names of Officers and Men of Monmouth and Ocean Counties Engaged in It, etc., etc. Bayonne, NJ: E. Gardner and Son, 1890.

External links

 Official county website

 
1850 establishments in New Jersey
Counties in the New York metropolitan area
Geography of the Pine Barrens (New Jersey)
Jersey Shore
Populated places established in 1850